Alvares is a Portuguese parish in the municipality of Góis. The population in 2011 was 812, in an area of 100.57 km².

References

Freguesias of Góis